Alice de Toledo Sommerlath (née Alice Soares de Toledo; 25 May 1906 – 9 March 1997) was the mother of Queen Silvia, wife  of King Carl XVI Gustaf of Sweden.

Early life
Sommerlath was born in the municipality of São Manuel in the Brazilian state of São Paulo, she was the youngest child and only daughter of Elisa Novais Soares (1881–1928) and her husband Arthur Floriano de Toledo (1873–1935).

Marriage and later life
On 10 December 1925, Alice Soares de Toledo married at Santa Cecília, São Paulo to German entrepreneur Walther Sommerlath (1901–1990), eventually moving to Germany with him. There, the couple had four children: 
Ralf Sommerlath (born 26 November 1929)
Walther Ludwig Sommerlath (1934–2020)
Hans Jörg Sommerlath (1941–2006)
Silvia Renate Sommerlath (born 23 December 1943), married in 1976 to Carl XVI Gustaf of Sweden

In 1932, date on which Brazilian women were considered eligible to vote, she came to hold in her own right: the title of elector, nomenclature that is a remnant of the brazilian monarchical period. 

From 1937 through 1947, they lived in Berlin.

From 1947 to 1957, the family lived in São Paulo, where Sommerlath's husband held positions such as president of the Brazilian subsidiary of Swedish company Uddeholm AB. In 1957, the Sommerlaths returned to Heidelberg. 

Sommerlath was widowed in October 1990. She suffered from heart disease and senile dementia and died at Drottningholm Palace in Ekerö Municipality, west of Stockholm in 1997. Her remains were buried in Heidelberg beside her husband's.

References

1906 births
1997 deaths
People from São Manuel
Brazilian people of Portuguese descent
Brazilian people of indigenous peoples descent
Brazilian emigrants to Germany
German people of Brazilian descent
Brazilian emigrants to Sweden